Daniel "Dani" Esmorís Tasende (born 6 July 2000) is a Spanish footballer who plays as a left back for Villarreal CF B.

Club career
Born in Coristanco, A Coruña, Galicia, Tasende started his career with EF Luis Calvo Sanz (the youth setup of Bergantiños FC) before moving to England in 2013, after his brother signed with Manchester City. He played two years in the club's Academy, before moving back to his home country and Bergantiños in 2015.

In 2016, Tasende moved to Villarreal CF's youth setup, and made his senior debut with the C-team on 15 March 2019, starting in a 3–0 Tercera División away loss against CD Roda. He was promoted to the reserves in Segunda División B ahead of the 2020–21 season, and scored his first senior goal on 1 November 2020, netting the equalizer in a 2–1 away win over CF La Nucía.

Tasende made his first team debut on 30 November 2021, coming on as a second-half substitute for Dani Raba in a 8–0 away routing of Victoria CF, for the season's Copa del Rey. He made his professional debut with the B-side the following 14 August, starting in a 2–0 away win over Racing de Santander.

Personal life
Tasende's older brother Angeliño is also a footballer and a left back. He also played for Manchester City as a youth.

References

External links

2000 births
Living people
Spanish footballers
Footballers from Galicia (Spain)
Association football defenders
Segunda División players
Primera Federación players
Segunda División B players
Tercera División players
Villarreal CF C players
Villarreal CF B players
Villarreal CF players